The coleto (Sarcops calvus) is a starling species (family Sturnidae) in the monotypic genus Sarcops. It is endemic to the Philippines. Its natural habitats are subtropical or tropical dry forest, subtropical or tropical moist lowland forest, and subtropical or tropical moist montane forest. In Central Visayas, this bird is commonly known as the sal-ing.

In 1760 the French zoologist Mathurin Jacques Brisson included a description of the coleto in his Ornithologie based on a specimen collected in the Philippines. He used the French name Le merle chauve des Philippines and the Latin Merula Calva Philippensis. Although Brisson coined Latin names, these do not conform to the binomial system and are not recognised by the International Commission on Zoological Nomenclature. When in 1766 the Swedish naturalist Carl Linnaeus updated his Systema Naturae for the twelfth edition, he added 240 species that had been previously described by Brisson. One of these was the coleto. Linnaeus included a brief description, coined the binomial name Gracula calva and cited Brisson's work. The specific name is from Latin calvus "bald" or "without hair". This species is now the only member of the genus Sarcops that was introduced by the English ornithologist Authur Walden in 1875. The name combines the Ancient Greek words sarx, sarkos "flesh" and ōps, ōpos "face" or "complexion".

Three subspecies are recognised:

 S. c. calvus (Linnaeus, 1766) – north Philippines
 S. c. melanonotus Ogilvie-Grant, 1906 – central and south Philippines
 S. c. lowii Sharpe, 1877 – Sulu Archipelago (southwest Philippines)

References

External links
 
 

Sturnidae
Endemic birds of the Philippines
Birds described in 1766
Taxa named by Carl Linnaeus
Taxonomy articles created by Polbot